Basavarajeshwari Camp is a village in Sindanur Taluka, Karnataka, India. It is located beside a canal that provides water to three ponds. One stores drinking water for the villagers, and the other two provide water for lands for paddy and wheat cultivation. The two ponds belong to Mullapudi Kumar Raju. He is very fond of his village Satyavathicamp. Satyavathi is the name of his grandmother.

References

SAHAKARA DARPANA, DISTRICTWISE LIST OF INSTITUTIONS: Raichur
SAHAKARA DARPANA, Institution:BASAVARAJESHWARI CAMP M P C S

External links
Map from Wikimapia

Villages in Raichur district